Fathabad-e Humeh or Fath Abad Hoomeh may refer to:
 Fathabad-e Humeh, Rafsanjan
 Fathabad-e Humeh, Zarand